Gosforth Central may refer to:

 Gosforth Central Academy, a school; see Building Schools for the Future
 Gosforth Central Park, a park near to Gosforth High Street in Gosforth, Newcastle upon Tyne, England